Miloš Đorđević (born 7 June 1992) is a Serbian football striker.

Career
A native of Kragujevac, Đorđević started out at the local Fitnes football school before moving to Radnički Kragujevac's academy in 2005. In November 2008 he made his first team debut for the third-tier club in the match against FK Inon Požarevac, coming in the 88th minute for Dragan Ristić. That would remain his only cap in the following two seasons. In April 2010 he went on trial at PSV Eindhoven and passed, signing a 1-year contract with possibility of further 2 years in June 2010., as the most expensive player of the youth team. He didn't make the first team, however, playing only for the youth setup, so his contract wasn't prolonged,  and he went on trial at K.R.C. Genk

Not passing the trial, he returned to Kragujevac in the winter break, signing for FK Radnički 1923 again. He remained for half a season there, before moving on to FK Smederevo in the Serbian SuperLiga. Unable to break in to the first team there properly, he joined the third-tier FK Pobeda Beloševac from Kragujevac for the spring part of the 2013/2014 season. He spent the 2014-2015 season at the second-tier FK Bežanija.

Đorđević went on trial at the Croatian Prva HNL team RNK Split in the summer of 2015, and passed it, signing a two-year contract in August 2015.

References

External links
 
 
 
 Miloš Đorđević at Utakmica.rs 

1992 births
Living people
Sportspeople from Kragujevac
Serbian footballers
FK Radnički 1923 players
FK Smederevo players
FK Bežanija players
Serbian First League players
Serbian SuperLiga players
RNK Split players
Croatian Football League players
Association football forwards